Club de Fútbol Gandarío Sanse is a football club based in San Sebastián de los Reyes in the autonomous Community of Madrid. Founded in 2001, it plays in the Primera de Aficionados. Its stadium is Polideportivo Dehesa Vieja with a capacity of 1,000 seats.

Season to season

0 seasons in Tercera División

External links
Official website
Madrid FA profile

Football clubs in the Community of Madrid
Divisiones Regionales de Fútbol clubs
Association football clubs established in 2001
2001 establishments in Spain